Olusegun Adejumo is a Nigerian visual artist, known for his female figure drawings and paintings. He is the director of One Draw Gallery and currently the president of the Guild of Professional Fine Artists Nigeria.

Education, life and work 
Adejumo was born on September 30, 1965 in Lagos. He attended the Yaba College of Education 1982 to 1987 and graduated with a Higher National Diploma (HND) in Painting. From 1987 to 1988, he served as a Painting Assistant Lecturer at the Lagos State Polytechnic. He also worked as an illustrator at the Advertising Techniques Limited in 1988.

Exhibitions

Organised projects 
 2017: Union Bank Centenary Art Challenge. OneDraw Gallery in partnership with Union Bank of Nigeria PLC
 2017: Co-curator Lagos state government team, 3-Day Art Exhibition Rasheed Gbadamosi Eko Art Expo, Lagos at 50

Selected solo exhibitions 
 2014: Emotions, Mydrim Gallery, Lagos
 2011: Les Designs d' Olusegun Adejumo, City Mall, Lagos
 2011: Ideal and Ideas, Nettatal Luxury, Port Harcourt
 2010: Make a wish- fundraising exhibition in support of breast and cervical cancer, Bloom Project, City Hall, Lagos
 2007: Expressions, Sandiland Arcade, VI Lagos
 2004: Lately, Truview Gallery, Lagos
 2004: The Drawing Room Project, Chapter One, Framemaster Gallery, Lagos
 1998: On Request, American Embassy Guest House, Lagos
 1994: Recent Paintings, Chevron Estate, Lagos 
 1994: Recent Paintings in Watercolour, Fenchurch Gallery, Lagos 
 1992: Diverse Siblings, Sans Culturel Francaise, Alliance Francais, Lagos
 1992: Diverse Siblings, the Club, Sheraton Hotels and Towers, Lagos

Selected group exhibitions 
 2016: Catharsis, Guild of Professional Fine Artists of Nigeria, Terra Kulture, Lagos
 2016: Oreze IV, a group exhibition in honour of His Royal Majesty Nnaemeka Alfred Ugochukwu Achebe, Obi of Onitsha (Agbogidi)
 2015: Art is Life (Promoting Nigerian Art and Culture), Total Village, Lagos
 2015: Oreze IV, a group exhibition in honour of His Royal Majesty Nnaemeka Alfred Ugochukwu Achebe, Obi of Onitsha (Agbogidi)
 2015: Infinite Treasures, Terra Kulture, Lagos
 2014: Distinction 2, Terra Kulture, Lagos
 2012: Nothing but the Truth, Mydrim Gallery, Lagos
 2012: Togetherness, South-South Economic Summit, Asaba
 2012: Imbued Essence, Exhibition of Contemporary Nigerian Paintings, Sculptures & Craft, London 2012 Olympic & Paralympic Games, Stratford
 2010: Crux of the Matter, Guild of Professional Artists of Nigeria, Lagos
 2010: Timeless, 10th Annual Pastel Exhibition, Mydrim Gallery, Lagos
 2010: Ancient to Modern, Lagos State celebrating Nigeria at 50, Federal Palace Hotel, Lagos
 2009: Colours of Hope, An Exhibition in Support of Children Living with Cancer Foundation, Artistic Licence Gallery, Lagos
 2009: Walking with the Masters, Price Waterhouse Coopers, Lagos
 2009: Besançon vu par Nina et Adejumo, Centre de Linguistique Appliqee, Universite de Frache Comte Besançon France
 2009: Dialogue between Cultures, collaboration between Alliance Française and Society of Nigerian Artist, Lagos
 2008: Threshold, Guild of Professional Artists of Nigeria, Lagos
 2008: Art Expo, Lagos
 2008: The Giclee Print Exhibition, Hue Concept, Terra Kulture, Lagos
 2008: October Rain, The Society of Nigerian Artists, Lagos Chapter
 2008: Colours of Hope, An Exhibition in Support of Children Living with Cancer Foundation, Lagos
 2007: The Bond, Sachs Gallery, Lagos
 2007: Colours of Hope, An Exhibition in Support of Children Living with Cancer Foundation, Terra Kulture, Lagos
 2007: Little Treasures, Miniature Art Fair, Framemaster Ltd, Lagos
 2007: Hellenic Images and Fifty Four Nigerian Artist in Translation, Greek Embassy, Lagos
 2006: Premier Exposition, Watercolour Society of Nigeria, Terra Kulture, Lagos
 2005: Rejuvenation, Society of Nigerian Artists, Mydrim Gallery, Lagos
 2005: Concert of Five, Lifestrokes Gallery, Abuja
 2005: 5th Annual Pastel Exhibition, Mydrim Gallery, Lagos
 2004: Figure Drawings, Hourglass Gallery, Lagos
 2004: The Matrix and the Muse, Framemaster Gallery, Lagos
 2004: Selected for the 19th Annual Philadelphia Art Expo, October Gallery, USA
 2002: Highlights, 2nd Annual Pastel Exhibition, Mydrim Gallery, Lagos
 2002: The Aso Rock Collection, African Foundation for the Arts, Lagos
 2002: Jigida, The Great Room, Grosevenor House, Park Lane, London
 2000: Take One Woman, Atrium Gallery, London
 2000: First Light, Vermilion Gallery, Lagos
 2000: Behind the Wall, Vermilion Gallery, Lagos
 1998: From the Cradle, Yaba College of Education, Goethe Institute, Lagos
 1997: Young Master Artist Club, Signature Gallery, Lagos
 1997: Six Artist, Mydrim Gallery, Lagos
 1994: Devine Inspiration, Mauba Gallery, Lagos
 1994: Let it Flow, Mydrim Gallery, Lagos
 1992: Myriads of Thoughts, Mydrim Gallery, Lagos
 1991: A Splash of Colours, Terri's Food Chain, Lagos
 1989: Nigerian Arts and Crafts, American Embassy, Lagos
 1988: Collectives, Barnette Gallery, Lagos

Auctions 
 2013: Arthouse Contemporary Limited 'Modern and Contemporary Art', Lagos  
 2013: TKMG, Terra Kulture Mydrim Gallery, Lagos Art Auction
 2011: TKMG, Terra Kulture Mydrim Gallery, Art Auction, Lagos
 2011: Arthouse Contemporary Limited 'Modern and Contemporary Art', Lagos

Selected commissioned works 
 Ceiling Fresco, Four Season Towers Aim Consultants (Elias Building on Ereko Street)
 Portrait of Professor Odunjo of Morbid Anatomy Department, Lagos University Teaching Hospital
 Portrait of 1988 Rotary President, Barrister Solaru, Rotary Club District 911

Selected workshop experience 
 2011: Living legends- Wole Soyinka, National Gallery of Arts, Lagos

Selected book illustrations 
 No Supper for Eze, Farafina Educational Books, Kachifo Limited
 No School for Eze, Farafina Educational Books, Kachifo Limited
 Only Bread for Eze, Farafina Educational Books, Kachifo Limited

Selected speaking seminars 
 2012: Sharing my work experience, Obafemi Awolowo University, Ile-Ife
 2011: Surviving as a Visual Artist in the 21st Century, Obafemi Awolowo University, Ile-Ife
 2008: Nigerians at Work. The 3 Nigerian Art Stakeholders Conference of African Art Resource Centre (AARC)
 2007: Young Artist and His Market Place- Swimming Against the Tide (Art Zero), National Gallery of Art, Lagos

Awards and residency 
 2016: Residency, West African Artist Collectives, Villa Karon kulttuurilehti, Grand Popo, Benin Republic
 2015: Homage to Efua Nubuke Foundation East Legon, Accra, Ghana
 2013: Residency, West African Artist Collectives, Villa Karon kulttuurilehti, Grand Popo, Benin Republic
 2012: Residency, West African Artist Collectives, Villa Karon kulttuurilehti, Grand Popo, Benin Republic
 2011: Residency, West African Artist Collectives, Villa Karon kulttuurilehti, Grand Popo, Benin Republic
 1997: Shortlisted for the Common Wealth Fellowship Award
 1984: Best Student in General Art, Yaba College of Technology, Gong Gallery Award

Affiliations and memberships 
 Guild of Fine Artist Nigeria (GFAN)
 Society of Nigerian Artist (SNA)
 International Stone League, Nigeria (ISLN)
 Watercolour Society of Nigeria (WSN)

References

External links 
 Official Website
 One Draw Gallery

Living people
Yaba College of Technology alumni
Nigerian artists
1965 births